The Slater Mill is a historic water-powered textile mill complex on the banks of the Blackstone River in Pawtucket, Rhode Island, modeled after cotton spinning mills first established in England. It is the first water-powered cotton spinning mill in North America to utilize the Arkwright system of cotton spinning as developed by Richard Arkwright.

Samuel Slater, the mill's founder, apprenticed as a young man in Belper, England, with industrialist Jedediah Strutt. Shortly after immigrating to the United States, Slater was hired by Moses Brown of Providence, Rhode Island, to produce a working set of machines necessary to spin cotton yarn using water power. Construction of the machines was completed in 1793, as well as a dam, waterway, waterwheel, and mill. Manufacturing was based on Richard Arkwright's cotton spinning system, which included carding, drawing, and spinning machines. Slater initially hired children and families to work in his mill, establishing a pattern that was replicated throughout the Blackstone Valley and known as the "Rhode Island System". It was later eclipsed by Francis Cabot Lowell's Waltham System. The mill and surrounding area were the site of early labor resistance, including the first factory strike in the United States, which was led by young women workers in 1824. 

Slater Mill was added to the National Register of Historic Places and designated a National Historic Landmark on November 13, 1966, the first property to be listed on the register. In December 2014, the mill was added to the newly formed Blackstone River Valley National Historical Park.

Architectural history

The original portion of the Slater Mill built in 1793 was six bays long and two stories tall. Several additions were made beginning in 1801, and a second added in 1835. Between 1869 and 1872, a large addition was made to the north end of the mill. Cotton spinning continued until 1895, after which the mill was used for various industrial purposes until 1923. The building had suffered numerous fires in the past, and two fires occurred in 1912 which precipitated awareness of the building and the need for its preservation.

From mill to museum
In 1921, the non-profit Old Slater Mill Association was founded with the purpose of saving the historic Mill. Efforts to restore the mill began in 1923; modern additions to the structure were removed, restoring the mill to its 1835 appearance. In 1955, it opened as a museum. Restoration of the nearby Wilkinson Mill (built 1810–1811) was completed in 1978 as part of the Slater Mill site.

The Slater Mill site now serves as a museum, educational center, and music venue, which "celebrates innovation and the entrepreneurial spirit by engaging audiences in relevant cultural, historic, and artistic endeavors". It includes five acres of land on both sides of the Blackstone River, a dam on the river, two historic mills (the Slater Mill and Wilkinson Mill), and the Sylvanus Brown House (a house built in 1758 but moved to the site in the 1960s).

The Slater Mill and other key buildings that are part of the Old Slater Mill Historic District were acquired by the National Park Service in 2021.

See also

Hannah Slater
Samuel Slater
David Wilkinson
Blackstone River Valley National Heritage Corridor
Derwent Valley Mills
National Register of Historic Places listings in Pawtucket, Rhode Island
List of National Historic Landmarks in Rhode Island

References

External links

Providence Journal video of Slater Mill Historic Site
Providence Journal video of the Blackstone River
Site about Slater and his mill
Pawtucket Arts Festival

1793 establishments in Rhode Island
Buildings and structures in Pawtucket, Rhode Island
Cotton mills in the United States
Historic American Buildings Survey in Rhode Island
Historic American Engineering Record in Rhode Island
History of the textile industry
Industrial archaeological sites in the United States
Industrial buildings and structures on the National Register of Historic Places in Rhode Island
Industrial buildings completed in 1793
Industrial Revolution
Industry museums in Rhode Island
Mill museums in the United States
Museums established in 1955
Museums in Providence County, Rhode Island
National Historic Landmarks in Rhode Island
National Register of Historic Places in Pawtucket, Rhode Island
Textile machinery manufacturers
Textile museums in Rhode Island
Tourist attractions in Pawtucket, Rhode Island
1955 establishments in Rhode Island
Blackstone River Valley National Historical Park